Lebanon High School is the public high school of Lebanon Community Unit School District 9 in Lebanon, Illinois.

Athletics
Lebanon competes in the Cahokia Conference, and is a member of the Illinois High School Association (IHSA), the organization which governs most sports and competitive activities.  Teams are stylized as the greyhounds.

The following teams placed in the top four of their respective IHSA sponsored state championship tournaments:

 Cross Country:  4th place (1977–78); State Champions (1976–77)
 Softball: 2nd place (2009–10); 4th place (2007–08); 2nd place (1996–97)
 Track & Field (boys):  4th place (1971–72, 1975–76); 2nd place (1976–77)
 Baseball: 3rd place (2009–10)
 Girls Basketball: 3rd place (2017-2018)

Notable alumni
 Neal Cotts
 Craig Virgin
 Kristin Espique

References

External links
 Official website

Public high schools in Illinois
Schools in St. Clair County, Illinois